Lemyra barliga is a moth in the family Erebidae. It was described by Thomas in 1990. It is found on Luzon in the Philippines. The habitat consists of primary mountain forests at altitudes ranging from 1,550 to 1,900 meters.

The length of the forewings is 16–20 mm for males and about 27 mm for females.

References

 

barliga
Moths described in 1990